The Des Moines City Council is the legislative branch that governs the City of Des Moines, Iowa and its more than 214,000 citizens.  It has 7 members, including the mayor, 2 of whom are at-large and 4 of whom represent the city's four wards. All serve four-year terms. The council has a council–manager form of government.

History

Current city council
The current Mayor of Des Moines and manager of the city council is Frank Cownie, a Democrat. Carl Voss and Connie Boesen are at-large council members. Indira Sheumaker represents Ward I, Linda Westergaard for Ward II, Josh Mandelbaum for Ward III, and Joe Gatto for Ward IV. Aweb|url=https://www.desmoinesregister.com/story/news/politics/2021/10/25/diverse-central-iowa-candidates-running-for-local-office-in-2021-ankeny-des-moines/6055879001/ |title=Record number of candidates of color running in Polk County elections; November could bring many firsts. |publisher=The Des Moines Register |accessdate=2021-11-05}}</ref>

In the November 2021 elections, Connie Boesen and Josh Mandelbaum were reelected. Indira Sheumaker ousted incumbent Bill Gray for Ward I.

Members of the Des Moines City Council

See also
Des Moines City Hall

References

City councils in the United States
Government of Des Moines, Iowa